The 2009–10 season was Bolton Wanderers 11th season in the Premier League, and their ninth consecutive season in the top division of English football and covers the period from 1 July 2009 to 30 June 2010. Bolton Wanderers failed to win the 2009–10 Premier League title, making it the 71st time that they have competed at the top level without winning the title, the most of any club.

The team kit for the 2009–10 season was produced by Reebok who were replaced as shirt sponsor by 188BET after nineteen years. Reebok still held naming rights to the stadium. To reflect the change in sponsor the home kit was changed to an all-white body with black vertical lines nearer the bottom. The away kit was the same as the home but blue, whilst the 188bet logo was white.

Pre-season
Bolton confirmed that they would not be taking up the option of signing Euzebiusz Smolarek, Sébastien Puygrenier or Ariza Makukula after the end of the previous season, and all returned to their parent clubs.

Bolton announced on 6 May 2009 that long serving goalkeeper Jussi Jääskeläinen had been granted a testimonial against Hibernian at the Reebok Stadium on 8 August. This was later followed by an announcement that the club would play Hibs' neighbours Hearts at Tynecastle four days earlier. On 12 June, the club published its full set of pre-season fixtures which included a three-game tour of Germany and the Netherlands, where the team met Borussia Mönchengladbach, Den Bosch and FC Eindhoven. Local fixtures were organised against Leigh Genesis, Altrincham, Fleetwood Town and Chorley.

The first team finished its pre-season unbeaten, drawing all their games with the exception of Den Bosch, which they won 2–1, with Sam Ricketts and Kevin Davies scoring. The younger players did not do as well, the game against Leigh Genesis, where the new away kit was revealed, being their only victory.

Full season
Bolton's Premier League season did not get off to the best of starts, a 0–1 home defeat to Sunderland. This was followed by a similar reverse away to Hull City. This immediately put pressure on manager Gary Megson, with some fans chanting for his resignation during Bolton's 1–0 League Cup victory at Tranmere Rovers three days later. Bolton went into the international break on the back of a 2–3 defeat to Liverpool, Sean Davis being sent off with Bolton leading 2–1. This would prove to be Davis' last game of the season after an operation on his articular cartilage.

The international break appeared to do the team some good as they went on a five-game unbeaten run, lasting until the next international break. A last-minute Gary Cahill goal saw Portsmouth fall in a 3–2 victory at Fratton Park, and a week later another last-minute goal, this time a penalty converted by Matt Taylor, salvaged a point at home to Stoke City. Another late goal, this time from captain Kevin Davies, took Bolton's third round League Cup tie against West Ham United into extra time, from which Bolton prevailed 3–1, and yet another late goal, time from Lee Chung-yong, gave Bolton a 2–1 victory at Birmingham City, pushing Bolton up to 13th place. The team returned from the fortnight's break to suffer a narrow defeat to Manchester United at Old Trafford, Matt Taylor scoring in a 2–1 defeat which saw Zat Knight score an own goal. The club, however, bounced back a week later to defeat Everton 3–2 at Reebok Stadium, with Ivan Klasnić scoring the winner, his first goal for the club, after having been knocked unconscious minutes earlier. This, however, was Bolton's last win for seven games as they went on a run that included two successive 4–0 defeats to Chelsea, the first away in the League Cup, the second at home three days later with Zat Knight scoring another own goal. A 5–1 defeat at Aston Villa followed before a 0–2 home defeat to local rivals Blackburn Rovers, who had not managed to collect an away point all season before the game and whose manager, the former Bolton manager Sam Allardyce, was incapacitated due to an impending heart operation. This run off defeats was halted after a 1–1 draw at Fulham but a 2–1 loss to fellow strugglers Wolverhampton Wanderers led to renewed pressure on the manager and calls for him to be replaced.

This, however, was the team's last defeat of the calendar year, a 3–3 draw at home against big spending Manchester City being followed with a 3–1 home victory against West Ham, which again lifted Bolton out of the relegation places. A chance to move further away from the bottom three was curtailed by the postponement of the last game before Christmas at Wigan Athletic. The Christmas programme started with a 1–1 draw at Lancashire rivals Burnley, managed by Bolton's former striker Owen Coyle, before former Bolton player and assistant manager Phil Brown brought his Hull side to the Reebok. The game ended in a 2–2 draw after Bolton had led 2–0, the home fans loudly booing the decision to replace goalscorer Ivan Klasnić with Gavin McCann while leading 2–1. The following morning, it was announced that manager Gary Megson had been relieved of his duties, with assistant manager Chris Evans and head coach Steve Wigley put in temporary charge.

Various names were mentioned when it came to replacing Megson, who called his dismissal "galling",
with ex-Bolton players Peter Reid and Gary Speed mentioned as manager and assistant to Alan Shearer respectively, as well as Darren Ferguson and Alan Curbishley. Two people who ruled themselves out of the running were Mark Hughes and Owen Coyle. In the meantime, the club safely came through its FA Cup third round tie at home to Lincoln City, winning 4–0. Despite earlier seeming to rule himself out of the job, however, Coyle quickly became the favourite to take the job and within three days of the FA Cup game, Burnley confirmed that their manager wanted to leave and join his former club. On 8 January 2010, it was announced that, after the clubs had agreed compensation, Coyle had been appointed manager of Bolton on a two-and-a-half-year deal. With Bolton's weekend game at Sunderland being postponed due to the weather, this meant that Coyle's first two games were due to be against Arsenal, home and away, losing the first 2–0 and the return 4–2. On Coyle's appointment, both Wigley and reserve team coach Alan Cork left the club on 10 January, with Evans following them out of the club two days later.

Coyle's first win in charge came in the FA Cup Fourth Round with a 2–0 defeat of Sheffield United and his first win in the Premier League was a 1–0 defeat of his former club Burnley, during which he was subjected to abuse from the away fans. January finished with a 2–0 away defeat at Liverpool. The January transfer window saw Bolton loan Vladimír Weiss from Manchester City and Jack Wilshere from Arsenal, as well as bringing in American international Stuart Holden on a free transfer, all until the end of the season, while the club loaned out Nicky Hunt to Derby County, Tope Obadeyi to Rochdale and Mark Connolly to St Johnstone, all again until the end of the season. Meanwhile, Ricardo Vaz Tê refused a loan deal to Hamilton Academical.

February started with a 0–0 draw at home to Fulham after which it was confirmed that Gary Cahill had suffered a blood clot in his arm and could be out for the rest of the season. Cahill, however, returned to the side in mid-March. In Cahill's absence, the team did not win a game until the end of February, going down 2–0 at Manchester City and 3–0 at Blackburn while drawing 0–0 at Wigan Athletic. They were also knocked out of the FA Cup by Tottenham Hotspur when, after a 1–1 draw at the Reebok, Spurs won the replay 4–0. Bolton recorded their first win in a month on 27 February with a 1–0 win over Wolves, during which Zat Knight scored his first goal for the club. March began with Bolton securing a second successive win for the first and only time in the season, winning at West Ham 2–1, before the run immediately came to an end with a 4–0 reversal at Sunderland. Bolton then beat Wigan by the same score with Fabrice Muamba scoring his first goal for the club.

Bolton then went on another poor run with four successive defeats to Everton, Manchester United, Aston Villa and Chelsea, failing to score in the process. This lasted until the 85th minute of the following game at Stoke before Matt Taylor scored two quick goals in a 2–1 win. A point from the next game against already relegated Portsmouth all but ensured Bolton's participation in the following season's top flight and although they lost to Spurs the following week, results in other games made sure. Bolton finished the season with a 2–1 home win against Birmingham.

After the final game of the season, it was announced that Lee Chung-yong has been awarded the club's Player of the Year as well as the Players' Player of the Year and Newcomer of the Year. The following day, when the club released the names of those that would be leaving the club, the two highest profile names were Ricardo Vaz Tê, who had been at the club since 2003, and Zoltán Harsányi, who had been there for three years.

Pre-season

Premier League

Results by matchday

Table

FA Cup

League Cup

Squad statistics

Statistics accurate as of match played 9 May 2010

Technical staff

Transfers

In

Out

Loan in

Loan out

References

Bolton Wanderers
Bolton Wanderers F.C. seasons